Clarence Mitchell may refer to:

 Clarence Mitchell (baseball) (1891–1963), American Major League Baseball pitcher
 Clarence Mitchell (bishop), Canadian Suffragan Bishop of the Diocese of Niagara
 Clarence Mitchell Jr. (1911–1984), American civil rights activist
 Clarence Mitchell III (1939–2012), American politician from Baltimore, Maryland
 Clarence Mitchell IV (born 1962), American radio host and former politician
 Clarence C. Mitchell (1897-1986), American lawyer and politician
 Brick Mitchell (Clarence Leon Mitchell, c. 1894–1963), American football player and coach